On 13 January 1985, an express train derailed on a curved bridge over the gorge of the Awash River in Awash, Ethiopia. The official death toll was 428, with more than 500 injuries.

Accident
On 13 January 1985, an express train was travelling from Dire Dawa to Addis Ababa on the rail line from Djibouti. It was overcrowded with approximately 1,000 passengers. Crossing the curved  bridge over the ravine at Awash, four of the train's carriages derailed, beginning with the rear carriage. All fell into the ravine. 

Initial reports were that as many as 449 had been killed; Ethiopian radio later reported 428 deaths. More than 500 were said to have been injured. 

The accident was the deadliest train crash in Africa, and was at the time the third-deadliest train accident worldwide.

Cause
The Ethiopian Ministry of Transportation blamed the crash on excessive speed on the curve; the driver was arrested.

References

1985 disasters in Ethiopia
1985 in Ethiopia
Rail disaster
Bridge disasters in Africa
Derailments in Ethiopia
January 1985 events in Africa
Rail transport in Ethiopia
Railway accidents in 1985
Transport disasters in Ethiopia